Nuvo or NUVO may refer to:

NUVO (newspaper), a newspaper in Indiana
Nuvo (liqueur), a liqueur.
nuvoTV